Jesper Damgaard (born May 6, 1975) is a retired Danish professional ice hockey player who last participated at the 2010 IIHF World Championship as a member of the Denmark men's national ice hockey team.

He was the first and so far only Danish player to have his number, (#7), retired by the Denmark men's national ice hockey team. He has represented Denmark at a record 17 consecutive World Championships, of which the last 8 were in the top division. He is the all-time most capped player for Denmark, having played for his country a record 256 times scoring 45 goals and 69 assists for a total of 114 points.

Damgaard was forced to retire following the 2010-11 season due to the aftermath of a concussion suffered while playing for the Malmö Redhawks. He attempted to return to the ice for the 2011 IIHF World Championship but was unable to shake the effects of the concussion.

In 2018, Damgaard was awarded the Torriani Award by the International Ice Hockey Federation for his contributions to Denmark's hockey.

Career statistics

References

External links

Living people
Danish ice hockey defencemen
Augsburger Panther players
HC Lugano players
Herning Blue Fox players
People from Holstebro
Malmö Redhawks players
Modo Hockey players
Revier Löwen players
Rødovre Mighty Bulls players
Torriani Award recipients
1975 births
Sportspeople from the Central Denmark Region